The Rough Ride (挑戰) is a TVB television series, premiered in 1985. Theme song "Me and You, He and Me" (我與你 他與我) composition and arrangement by Joseph Koo, lyricist by Wong Jim, sung by Anita Mui.

Cast
 Tony Leung as Chow Kim-hung
 Barbara Yung as Tse Bik-wah
 Lau Dan
 Ray Lui as Kong Tin-wai
 Ha Yu as Tsau Cheung-Yau
 Michael Tao
 Bobby Au Yeung as Tsuen

References 

1985 Hong Kong television series debuts
1985 Hong Kong television series endings
TVB dramas
1980s Hong Kong television series
Cantonese-language television shows